Zeno Clash 2 (stylized as Zeno Clash II) is a first-person action role-playing and beat 'em up video game developed by ACE Team as the follow-up to 2009's Zeno Clash. It was published by Atlus for Microsoft Windows, PlayStation 3 and Xbox 360 in 2013. The game is a direct sequel and features the same characters and setting as the first. It continues the story of Ghat, Rimat, and Father-Mother.

Plot 
The game begins with the first game's protagonist, Ghat, meeting with his antagonistic sister Rimat in a bar. Since the events of the last game, the Northern Golem has established the rule of law in the previously lawless city of Halstedom. After law was established the Golem promptly arrested Ghat and Rimat's single parent, the creature named Father-Mother, for the crime of serial kidnapping.
 
While Rimat is furious and wants revenge against the Golem for the arrest of Father-Mother, Ghat is a true anarchist and has come to hate the Golem for taking away Halstedom's freedom and wants to kill him to restore it. Regardless of their different motives, this shared anger at the Northern Golem leads them to set aside their differences. Together they enter the newly built prison and free Father-Mother. But by doing so, they end up in the middle of a conflict between the authoritarian Northern Golem and the laissez faire but cruel Southern Golem. To free their city from the tyranny of the seemingly invincible Northern Golem, they must journey through all of Zenozoik to find a method capable of killing their near immortal overlord, even if it means playing right into the Southern Golem's plans. Along the way, Ghat and Rimat will discover the secret past of their mysterious planet.

Gameplay 
Much like the previous game, Zeno Clash 2 is a first person brawler centered around melee combat. New is the ability to individually punch with each fist, use an array of special weapons that range from a simple chain to a glove that links enemy health together, and a semi open world instead of the mission based system of the first game.

Zeno Clash 2 features a multiplayer game mode, in contrast to the first game which was only single-player. The game also includes multiple forms of Arena modes which were included in the last game, and one of these Arena modes lets you play as the Rock from Rock of Ages.

Development 

Zeno Clash 2 was released on 30 April 2013, four years after the original. A demo for the game was released six days before the game itself.

Reception 

The game received "mixed or average reviews" on all platforms according to the review aggregation website Metacritic. Critics praised the artwork and characters but cited various flaws, and most seemed to agree that the game fell behind in comparison to the first game. Destructoid said, "Zeno Clash II might be bigger than its predecessor, but it fails to be truly better."

Sequel 

Clash: Artifacts of Chaos, a new installment in the Zeno Clash series, was announced at the Nacon Connect online press conference in July 2021 and was released on 9 February 2023.

References

External links 

 
 

2013 video games
ACE Team games
Action role-playing video games
Atlus games
Beat 'em ups
Fantasy video games
First-person shooters
Indie video games
Multiplayer and single-player video games
PlayStation 3 games
PlayStation Network games
Role-playing video games
Unreal Engine games
Video games developed in Chile
Video games featuring female protagonists
Video game sequels
Windows games
Xbox 360 games
Xbox 360 Live Arcade games